Cluedo (also known as Clue) is a murder mystery board game for three to six players.

Cluedo may also refer to:
 Cluedo (franchise), adaptations and spinoffs of the board game in several media, including:
 Cluedo (Australian game show)
 Cluedo (British game show)
 Cluedo: Discover the Secrets, a 2008 board game designed by Hasbro as a modernization of the original Cluedo board game
 List of Cluedo spinoff games, various games based on the Cluedo or Clue brands
 List of Cluedo video games, video games using the Cluedo or Clue brands
 Cluedo: Murder at Blackwell Grange, a 1998 video game
 Clue (iOS game), known as "Cluedo" in the UK and Europe
 Clue Chronicles: Fatal Illusion (also known as Cluedo Chronicles: Fatal Illusion), a 1999 PC point-and-click adventure game
 Cluedo DVD Game, a 2006 interactive game for DVD players
 "Cluedo", a song by We Are the Physics from Your Friend, The Atom

See also

 Clue, disambiguation page including variants and spin-offs of Cluedo released under its alternative name/brand, Clue